Phigalia pilosaria, the pale brindled beauty, is a moth of the family Geometridae. The species was first described by Michael Denis and Ignaz Schiffermüller in 1775. It is found from Europe and Anatolia to the Caucasus.

The wingspan is 35–40 mm for males. Females are wingless. The male is grey with a more or less strong olivaceous tinge, sometimes mixed with some ochreous or with some whitish scales. The lines are variable,
thickened and darkened at the margins. The  female is stouter than that of E. defoliaria, with a longer ovipositor and dorsally more or less brownish, abdomen spinose. — ab. extinctaria Stndf. is a paler, almost unicolorous form of the   male - ab. monacharia Stgr. is unicolorous blackish or even quite black. Chiefly from Yorkshire. The  larva is brown mottled with ferruginous, frequently with V-shaped ochreous dorsal marks on the 2nd and 3rd abdominal segments. 

Adults are on wing from January to April. There is one generation per year.

The larva feeds on various deciduous trees, including Quercus species.

References

External links

Lepiforum e.V.

pale brindled beauty (Phigalia pilosaria)
Bistonini
Moths of Europe
Moths of Asia
Taxa named by Michael Denis
Taxa named by Ignaz Schiffermüller
Moths described in 1775